Giulian Alexis André Biancone (born 31 March 2000) is a French professional footballer who plays as a defender for Premier League club Nottingham Forest.

Early life
Giulian Alexis André Biancone was born on 31 March 2000 in Fréjus, Var.

Club career
Biancone made his professional debut with Monaco in a 2–0 UEFA Champions League loss to Atlético Madrid on 28 November 2018.

In July 2019, Biancone joined Monaco's satellite club Cercle Brugge on a season-long loan.

On 12 August 2021, Ligue 1 club Troyes signed Biancone on a five-year contract.

On 3 July 2022, Biancone signed a three-year contract with Premier League club Nottingham Forest for an undisclosed fee. On 23 August, he made his debut for the club in a 3–0 win over Grimsby Town in the EFL Cup. On 31 August, Biancone made his Premier League debut as a substitute for Cheikhou Kouyaté in a 6–0 away defeat to champions Manchester City.

International career
Biancone is a youth international for France, having represented the France U19s.

Career statistics

References

External links

Profile at the Nottingham Forest F.C. website

2000 births
Living people
Sportspeople from Fréjus
Footballers from Provence-Alpes-Côte d'Azur
French footballers
Association football defenders
AS Monaco FC players
Cercle Brugge K.S.V. players
ES Troyes AC players
Nottingham Forest F.C. players
Premier League players
Ligue 1 players
Championnat National 2 players
Belgian Pro League players
France youth international footballers
French expatriate footballers
Expatriate footballers in Belgium
Expatriate footballers in England
French expatriate sportspeople in Belgium
French expatriate sportspeople in England
Championnat National 3 players
French people of Italian descent